Pseudoeurycea werleri is a species of salamander in the family Plethodontidae. Its common name is Werler's false brook salamander or simply Werler's salamander. It is endemic to the Sierra de los Tuxtlas range in southern Veracruz state, Mexico.
Its natural habitats are tropical rainforests and cloud forests where it lives in moss mats. It is threatened by habitat loss caused by subsistence agriculture, logging, and human settlement.

References

werleri
Endemic amphibians of Mexico
Endemic fauna of Los Tuxtlas
Taxonomy articles created by Polbot
Amphibians described in 1954